Charles Augustus, Hereditary Grand Duke of Saxe-Weimar-Eisenach  may refer to:
Charles Augustus, Hereditary Grand Duke of Saxe-Weimar-Eisenach (1844–1894)
Charles Augustus, Hereditary Grand Duke of Saxe-Weimar-Eisenach (1912–1988)